Praying is engaging in prayer, an active effort to communicate with a higher being, deity, or spirit.

Praying or Prayin' may also refer to:

 "Praying" (song), by Kesha, 2017
 "Prayin (Plan B song), 2010
 "Prayin (Johnny Logan song), 2013
 "Praying", a song by Keiino from Okta, 2020
 "Praying", a song by the Louvin Brothers from Nearer My God to Thee, 1957

See also
 Pray (disambiguation)
 Prayer (disambiguation)